Moustafa Fahim (10 July 1925 – 29 April 2010) was an Egyptian boxer. He competed at the 1948 Summer Olympics and the 1952 Summer Olympics.

References

1925 births
2010 deaths
Egyptian male boxers
Olympic boxers of Egypt
Boxers at the 1948 Summer Olympics
Boxers at the 1952 Summer Olympics
Place of birth missing
Mediterranean Games medalists in boxing
Middleweight boxers
Boxers at the 1951 Mediterranean Games
Mediterranean Games gold medalists for Egypt
20th-century Egyptian people